Estonia participated in The VII. Winter Paralympic Games in Nagano, Japan. Estonian flag bearer at the opening ceremony was Vilma Nugis.

Estonia entered 16 athletes in the following sports:
Biathlon and Cross-country skiing: 2 females and 2 males
Ice sledge hockey: 12 males 
Ice sledge speed racing

The 1998 Estonian Paralympic Team
Estonian delegation – 16 athletes and 9 officials: Estonian Paralympic Committee president Toomas Vilosius, delegation leader Allan Kiil, team manager Maarit Vabrit, press representative Are Eller, sledge hockey referee Aleksandr Pavlovski, massage therapist Vladimir Sinenki and coaches Külli Hallik, Tõnu Kinks and Eduard Šedasev.

Biathlon
 Vilma Nugis

Cross-country skiing
 Velory Kais
 Taisto Sillamägi
 Vilma Nugis
 Sabina Treial

Ice sledge hockey: Team Roster: 12 men

Name, no, club, position, goals

 Viktor Karlenko – SK Ordo Narva
 Viktor Artemjev – SK Ordo Narva, Defenceman
 Vjatšeslav Vassiljev
 Raul Sas – Net Minder
 Maksim Vedernikov – HC Panter Tallinn, Forward
 Leonid Zubov – SK Ordo Narva, Forward
 Kaido Kalm – HC Panter Tallinn, Center, Captain
 Jüri Tammleht – HC Panter Tallinn, Center
 Arvo Kelement – Defenceman
 Arvi Piirioja – HC Panter Tallinn, Forward 
 Anatoli Ajupov – SK Ordo Narva
 Aleksandr Jarlõkov – HC Panter Tallinn, Forward

Results by event

Biathlon

 Vilma Nugis
 Women's 7.5 km Free Technique B2-3 – Real time: 41.05,1 (Missed shots: 4) Factor(%): 100; Finish time: 41.05,1 (→ 5. place )

Cross-country skiing

 Velory Kais
 Men's 5 km Classical Technique ID – 18.48,2 (→ 10. place )
 Men's 15 km Free Technique ID – 40.16,8 (→ 21. place ) 
 Men's 20 km Classical Technique ID – 1:28.40,0 (→ 12. place )
 Taisto Sillamägi
 Vilma Nugis
 Women's 5 km Free Technique B2-3 – 19.16,9 (→ 10. place ) 
 Women's 5 km Classical Technique B2-3 – (→ dq, no ranking )
 Women's 15 km Classical Technique B1-3 – 1:09.51,6 (→ 11. place )
 Sabina Treial
 Women's 5 km Free Technique ID – 23.24,2 (→ 11. place )
 Women's 5 km Classical Technique ID – 24.35,2 (→ 11. place )
 Women's 15 km Classical Technique ID – 1:21.45,8 (→ 8. place )

Ice sledge speed racing

 Jüri Tammleht
 Men's 100 m LW11 – Finish time: 19,79 (→ 7. place )
 Men's 500 m LW11 – Finish time: 1.22,79 (→ 7. place )
 Men's 1000 m LW11 – Finish time: 3.04,57 (→ 8. place )
 Maksim Vedernikov
 Men's 1,000 m LW11 – Finish time: 2.45,34 (→ 7. place )

Ice sledge hockey

 Estonian sledge hockey team:
 Preliminary Group A Round 1: defeated  6:0 ( 2:0, 2:0, 2:0 )
 Preliminary Group A Round 2: lost to  3:6 ( 0:4, 1:2, 2:0 ) ( 3 goals for Sweden from Jens Kask, who has Estonian roots )
 Play off semi final game: lost to  1:4 ( 0:1, 0:2, 1:1 ) 
 Bronze medal game: lost to  1:10 ( 1:3, 0:3, 0:4 ) (→ 4. place )

See also
1998 Winter Paralympics
Estonia at the Paralympics
Estonia at the 1998 Winter Olympics

References

External links
International Paralympic Committee
 Estonian Paralympic Committee

Paralympics
1998
Nations at the 1998 Winter Paralympics